Pachychilon macedonicum is a species of ray-finned fish in the family Cyprinidae.
It is found in Greece and North Macedonia.
Its natural habitats are rivers and freshwater lakes.
It is threatened by habitat loss.

Sources

Pachychilon
Fish described in 1892
Taxonomy articles created by Polbot